Heaven Knows may refer to:

Albums
 Heaven Knows (Jaki Graham album), 1985
 Heaven Knows (Blancmange album), 1992
 Heaven Knows (Rick Price album), 1992

Songs
 "Heaven Knows" (Donna Summer song), 1978
 "Heaven Knows" (Robert Plant song), 1988
 "Heaven Knows" (When in Rome song), 1988
 "Heaven Knows" (Lalah Hathaway song), 1990
 "Heaven Knows" (Rick Price song), 1992
 "Heaven Knows" (Luther Vandross song), 1993
 "Heaven Knows" (Squeeze song), 1995
 "Heaven Knows" (Nana Mizuki song), 2001
 "Heaven Knows" (Taylor Hicks song), 2006
 "Heaven Knows" (The Pretty Reckless song), 2013
 "Heaven Knows", by Boyzone from A Different Beat, 1996
 "Heaven Knows", by The Corrs from Forgiven, Not Forgotten, 1995
 "Heaven Knows", by The Grass Roots from Leaving It All Behind, 1969
 "Heaven Knows", by Mari Hamada from Colors, 1990
 "Heaven Knows", by Rise Against from Revolutions per Minute, 2003

See also
 Heaven Only Knows (disambiguation)